Needham is a historic home located near Farmville, in Cumberland County, Virginia.  It was constructed in 1802, and is a two-story, three-bay, single-pile, central hall plan frame dwelling.  It has a two-story rear ell, with one-story addition built in 1929, although most of the former outbuildings have now disappeared.

It was the home of educator, jurist, and politician Creed Taylor(1766-1836). as well as his son Creed Taylor Jr. (1791-1873). The elder Taylor established a  proprietary law school in Richmond and moved it in the 1820s to this estate (it was Virginia's second law school and the nation's fourth), where it trained about 300 lawyers including U.S. President John Tyler's son, Ohio Supreme Court justice William Y. Gholson and future U.S. Congressmen John Minor Botts, Joseph William Chinn and John Hall Fulton as well as future Missouri governor and Confederate general Sterling Price. Although the law school had closed by 1840 (and perhaps a decade earlier, following the establishment of the University of Virginia Law School in 1829). In 1831 Anne Jane Gholson, the mother of novelist Ellen Glasgow was born at Needham.

Needham has been listed on the National Register of Historic Places since 1988. Virginia erected a historic marker concerning the proprietary law school in 2000.

References

Chancellor Creed Taylor and his wife, Sally deGraffenried (Woodson Taylor, had no children. The Creed Taylor who inherited the "Needham" property was his great nephew and namesake.  This Creed, called "Young Creed", was born at Needham on 3 Aug 1807 and died there 16 Jan 1868, his wife was, Lucy Ann Matilda Woodson. He was also trained in the law The property passed to their youngest daughter, May Taylor wife of Albert Howard. "Young Creed" was the son of Samuel Taylor (nephew of the Chancellor) and Martha Woodson, youngest sister of Sally.  Martha died at Needham 7 Feb 1810 of child-bed fever. Her three children were adopted by the Chancellor and his wife. Sources: Will of Chancellor Creed Taylor, original in my possession, Henry Morton Woodson, Woodsons and Their Connections (1915, Nashville, Tenn.), Writings of John Randolph, a great friend of Chancellor Taylor, Various deeds of the Needham property.

Houses on the National Register of Historic Places in Virginia
Federal architecture in Virginia
Houses completed in 1802
Houses in Cumberland County, Virginia
National Register of Historic Places in Cumberland County, Virginia